George Harrison – The Vinyl Collection is a box set by English musician George Harrison, released on 24 February 2017. The box set contains sixteen vinyl LPs – comprising Harrison's entire output of studio albums from Wonderwall Music (1968) to the posthumously released Brainwashed (2002), together with the double live album Live in Japan (1992) – and two 12-inch vinyl, picture-disc singles.

The box set's release coincided with what would have been the artist's 74th birthday. Accompanying the release, Genesis Publications launched an extended edition of Harrison's 1980 autobiography, I, Me, Mine, featuring new material compiled by his widow, Olivia Harrison.

Among contemporary reviews, The Vinyl Collection received high ratings from publications such as Classic Rock, Mojo (who gave it a maximum five stars), Uncut and Under the Radar. Less impressed, Will Hodgkinson of The Times said that while some of the albums were "masterpieces", the box set was "for Harrison nuts only", given its high retail price (£389.99) and the uneven quality of the artist's solo career, although he added: "even in the less essential moments there are gems to be unearthed." Writing for the New York Observer, Ron Hart welcomed the release, saying that much of Harrison's work was routinely overlooked and the box set was an opportunity to "reassess the genius of a man whose influence can be heard through a diverse array of modern artists".

Box-set contents

References

2017 compilation albums
George Harrison compilation albums
Albums produced by George Harrison
Compilation albums published posthumously
Albums recorded at Apple Studios
Albums recorded at FPSHOT
Albums recorded at A&M Studios
Albums recorded at Trident Studios
Albums produced by Phil Spector
Albums produced by Jeff Lynne